Richard Caldicot (7 October 1908 – 16 October 1995) was an English actor famed for his role of Commander (later Captain) Povey in the BBC radio series The Navy Lark.  He also appeared often on television, memorably as the obstetrician delivering Betty Spencer's baby in Some Mothers Do 'Ave 'Em.

His father was a civil servant and he attended Dulwich College prior to training at the Royal Academy of Dramatic Art. He then appeared in repertory theatre and on the London stage from 1928. Among numerous West End appearances, he played Lance-Corporal Broughton in the original production of Journey's End from 1929–30, Harry Soames in Edward, My Son (1947–49) and Mr Bromhead in No Sex Please, We're British from 1971 to 1976. His film debut was in The Million Pound Note (1954).

Caldicot's television appearances include The Four Just Men, The Prisoner: "Many Happy Returns", Steptoe and Son, Vanity Fair, Fawlty Towers and Coronation Street. He was also seen in the United States on The Beverly Hillbillies.

Caldicot worked virtually right up till his death in October 1995.

Filmography

 Calling Bulldog Drummond (1951) – Judge (uncredited)
 The Million Pound Note (1954) – James, the Butler (uncredited)
 One Good Turn (1955) – Mr. Bigley
 A Question of Adultery (1958) – Mr. Duncan
 Virgin Island (1958)
 The Horse's Mouth (1958) – Roberts (uncredited)
 Room at the Top (1959) – Taxi Driver (uncredited)
 Horrors of the Black Museum (1959) – Ted, barman in night club (uncredited)
 Follow a Star (1959) – Conductor (uncredited)
 Clue of the Twisted Candle (1960) – Ake Pisher
 The Trials of Oscar Wilde (1960) – Bookshop Proprietor (uncredited)
 Dentist on the Job (1961) – Prison Governor
 The Court Martial of Major Keller (1961) – Harrison
 The Durant Affair (1962) – The Judge
 The Battleaxe (1962) – Judge
 Le voyage à Biarritz (1963)
 The V.I.P.s (1963) – Hotel Representative (uncredited)
 Echo of Diana (1963) – Fisher
 The Sicilians (1963) – Police Commissioner
 The Spy Who Came in from the Cold (1965) – Mr. Pitt (uncredited)
 You Must Be Joking! (1965) – (uncredited)
 The Weekend Murders (1970) – Mr. Caldicot, the lawyer
 The Rise and Rise of Michael Rimmer (1970) – Bream
 Professor Popper's Problem (1974) – Headmaster
 Eskimo Nell (1975) – Ambrose Cream
 Adventures of a Private Eye (1977) – Craddock
 Adventures of a Plumber's Mate (1978) – Wallings
 Firepower (1979) – Harry Calman
 Mountains of the Moon (1990) – Lord Russell
 The Fool (1990) – Duke

References

External links
 

1908 births
1995 deaths
English male radio actors
English male television actors
Male actors from London
People educated at Dulwich College
20th-century English male actors